Doncaster St. James F.C. was an English association football club based in Doncaster, South Yorkshire.

History
Little is known of the club other than that it competed in the FA Cup in the early twentieth century.

League and cup history

Records
Best FA Cup performance: 1st Qualifying Round, 1907–08, 1908–09, 1909–10

References

Defunct football clubs in England
Defunct football clubs in South Yorkshire
Hatchard League